Juliana Danielle "Julie" Kilian is a South African politician. She served as a Member of the National Assembly of South Africa for two political parties from 2009 until 2019. She represented the Congress of the People from 2009 to 2014 and the African National Congress between 2014 and 2019. Kilian was a senior member of the New National Party.

Life and career
Kilian was born in South Africa. She married Johan Kilian.

In 1974, Kilian became a Liaison Officer for the Department of Information. She and her husband were both senior members of the  New National Party. He was the provincial leader of the party in Gauteng while she represented the NNP in the Gauteng Provincial Legislature and served as the chairperson of the legislature's education committee.

In 2008, Kilian and her husband joined the Congress of the People. She was elected to the National Assembly as one of the party's first representatives. She was a member of the portfolio committee on communications.

Prior to the 2014 South African general election, Kilian resigned from COPE and joined the African National Congress. She was one of many parliamentarians who left COPE due to infighting. Her named placed on the ANC's election list and she returned to Parliament following the election. Her husband died in 2015.

In 2018, Kilian criticised AfriForum. She said that the lobby group does not "speak on behalf of myself and other progressive Afrikaans speakers".

Kilian left Parliament before the 2019 general election, as she was not listed as a candidate.

References

External links

Living people
Year of birth missing (living people)
Afrikaner people
Members of the Gauteng Provincial Legislature
Members of the National Assembly of South Africa
African National Congress politicians
Congress of the People (South African political party) politicians
South African women in politics